The Lycée français de Barcelone (LFB;) is a French international school in Barcelona, Catalonia, Spain. The school was founded in 1924 and is operated by the Agency for French Education Abroad. It has classes from maternelle (preschool) to lycée (senior high school).

The main campus is in Pedralbes, while the maternelle (preschool) campus is in Bonanova.

History
From 2000 to 2010 the school tuition rose by 57%. In 2010 about 500 families protested the rise in tuition by not paying the second trimester's enrollment.

As of 2013 the school does not translate notices and information into Catalan. In response to parents who asked for Catalan translations, the school argued that Catalan families understand Castillian Spanish well, making it unnecessary to translate things into Catalan.

Student body
As of 2010 there were 2,816 students, with 2,359 at the main campus and 457 at the maternelle campus.

As of 2010 the students come from 1,800 families. 1,000 families paid tuition, while 800 were on scholarships for 100% of their tuition. The latter were families of employees of French multinational companies, diplomats, teachers, and administrators.

Notable alumni
The children of the Urdangarín-Borbón marriage of the Spanish Royal Family attended this school.

See also
 
 Liceo Español Luis Buñuel, a Spanish international school near Paris, France

References

External links

 Lycée Français de Barcelone
  Lycée Français de Barcelone
  Association des Parents du Lycée Français de Barcelone/Asociación de los Padres del Liceo Francés de Barcelona
  Association des Parents du Lycée Français de Barcelone/Asociación de los Padres del Liceo Francés de Barcelona
  Liceo Francés de Barcelona – Écoles Françaises Espagne-Portugal (EFEP)
  "BARCELONE – Les parents d'élèves du lycée français ne veulent plus payer" (Archive). Le Petit Journal.

International schools in Barcelona
Barcelona
Private schools in Spain
1924 establishments in Spain
Educational institutions established in 1924